Abdon (Hebrew: עַבְדּוֹן ‘Aḇdōn, "servile" or "service"), was the son of Hillel, a Pirathonite, and was the eleventh Judge of Israel mentioned in the Book of Judges. He was a member of the tribe of Ephraim, and in the biblical account was credited with having forty sons and thirty grandsons. He restored order in the central area of Israel "after the disastrous feud with Jephtha and the Gileadites".
He judged Israel for eight years. He was buried on Ephraimite land, in Pirathon, in the hill-country of the Amalekites.

Veneration 
Abdon is venerated in Catholic Church as a saint. His feast day is 1 September.

See also 
Biblical judges
Book of Judges

References

External links
 International Standard Bible Encyclopedia
 Book of Judges article (Jewish Encyclopedia)

Year of birth unknown
Date of death unknown
Judges of ancient Israel
12th-century BCE Hebrew people
Christian saints from the Old Testament
Jewish Roman Catholic saints
Christian saints in unknown century